ITV strike may refer to:
 1968 ITV strike, which left ITV off the air for a few days and resulted in a transmission of an emergency national service for a few weeks afterward
 1979 ITV strike, which left ITV off the air for eleven weeks